This is a list of Greece's busiest airports per year by passenger traffic.

2021
Data taken from the official websites of the airports

2020
Data taken from  Hellenic Civil Aviation Authority (CAA)

2019
Data taken from  Hellenic Civil Aviation Authority (CAA)  and from the official websites of the airports

2018
Data taken from  Hellenic Civil Aviation Authority (CAA)  and from the official websites of the airports

2017
Data taken from  Hellenic Civil Aviation Authority (CAA)  and from the official websites of the airports

2016

2015

2014

2013

References

Gr
Airports in Europe